Clifton “Clif” Magness is an American singer, songwriter, record producer, and multi-instrumentalist, best known for co-writing and producing several tracks on Avril Lavigne’s 2002 debut album, Let Go including the song "Losing Grip".

At the 33rd Grammy Awards, Magness won a Grammy Award for Best Instrumental Arrangement Accompanying Vocal(s) for the song "The Places You Find Love" from Quincy Jones' album, Back On The Block. He received nominations for an Academy Award, Golden Globe Award, and Grammy for the theme song "The Day I Fall In Love" from the film Beethoven's 2nd.

Collaborations
Magness worked with Lavigne on her multi-platinum debut album, Let Go, co-writing 5 tracks and producing 6, including "Losing Grip", Mobile, "Unwanted", "My World", and "Too Much to Ask". Let Go reached the top of the album charts in Canada and the U.K., as high as #2 on the Billboard 200, and finished the year at #14 on Billboard'''s 200 Albums for 2002. Prior to leaving New York for Los Angeles to collaborate with Magness, Lavigne was assigned cowriters by her label, Arista, who "failed to click with a girl who'd just discovered guitar-based rock. Magness gave Lavigne the creative freedom she desired. "The harder-rocking songs on Let Go – specifically "Losing Grip" and "Unwanted" – had the sound she wanted for the whole album."

Following up his collaboration with Lavigne, Magness went on to work with original American Idol winner Kelly Clarkson on her debut album Thankful. The #1 album featured two productions by Magness. He co-wrote and produced two songs from Clarkson's multi-platinum second album, Breakaway. Magness also produced five songs for another American Idol contestant, Clay Aiken, on his debut album, Measure of a Man, including the single "Solitaire", which topped the 2004 Canadian chart for 4 weeks. Magness produced the longest radio air played song in Australian history, "Perfect", for Vanessa Amorosi.

Magness co-wrote the first single "Lights Out" and five other songs with Lisa Marie Presley from her debut album, To Whom It May Concern. The album debuted at No. 5 on the Billboard 200 album chart.

Early in his career, Magness co-wrote and produced the title track "All I Need" on Jack Wagner's debut album All I Need. In 1985, the song spent 2 weeks at the top of Billboard's Adult Contemporary chart. In 1990, Magness' collaboration with songwriter Steve Kipner resulted in a Billboard top 5 single for Wilson Phillips' "Impulsive".

Magness has also either co-written and/or produced tracks for Celine Dion, Jessica Simpson, Amy Grant, Hanson, Steve Perry, O-Town, Charlotte Martin, Rachel Loy, Wild Orchid, Judith Owen, Jude, Joe Bonamassa, The Urge, Kyle Vincent, Marie Digby, Andreya Triana, Days Difference, Ill Scarlett, Ivy Lies, Christina Grimmie, Caroline Sunshine, Jermaine Jackson, Barbra Streisand, Julio Iglesias, Sheena Easton, George Benson, Patti Austin and Al Jarreau.

Awards and nominations

Grammy Awards
1990 - Best Instrumental Arrangement Accompanying Vocal(s) - Won
Glen Ballard, Jerry Hey, Quincy Jones and Clif Magness (arrangers) for "The Places You Find Love" performed by Siedah Garrett & Chaka Khan
1994 - Best Song Written Specifically for a Motion Picture or for Television - Nominated
Carole Bayer Sager, Clif Magness, and James Ingram, for "The Day I Fall In Love" performed by Dolly Parton and James Ingram

Academy Awards
1993 - Music (Original Song) - Nominated
Carole Bayer Sager, Clif Magness, and James Ingram, for "The Day I Fall In Love" performed by Dolly Parton and James Ingram

Golden Globe Awards
1993 - Best Original Song - Motion Picture - Nominated
Carole Bayer Sager, Clif Magness, and James Ingram, for "The Day I Fall In Love" performed by Dolly Parton and James Ingram

Discography
Studio albums
 Solo (1994)		
 Lucky Dog (2018)
 Road to Gold: Official Collection of Lost Demos (2022)

with Planet 3
 A Heart from the Big Machine (1991)
 Music From the Planet (1992) (European version of A Heart from the Big Machine, with one song replaced)
 Gems Unearthed (2004)

with Marc Jordan
 Untitled (1996-1997) (Unreleased, possibly unfinished)

Singles
 "There's Nothing So Expensive as a Woman Who's Free for the Night" (1980) (as Clif Newton)
 "Rest of the Night" (1980) (as Clif Newton)
 "Footprints in the Rain" (1994)
 "Flower Girl" (1994)

Soundtrack appearances
 "Incommunicado", "Never Crossed My Mind" (from The Last Starfighter'') (1984)
 "Top of the Hill", "Hold On" (from Hot Dog: The Movie) (1984)

References

External links
Clif Magness - personal website
Clif Magness' Credits on AllMusic

Record producers from Texas
Songwriters from Texas
Living people
Year of birth missing (living people)
People from Lubbock, Texas